Lehm may refer to:

Henrik Lehm (born 1960), Danish professional football manage
Lehm., author's abbreviation for Johann Lehmann, German entomologist
Lehm, the original surname in the family of Stanislaw Lem

See also
Lehmann
Lehman (disambiguation)